Mount Tambourine may refer to:

Mount Tamborine, Queensland - suburb on Tambourine Mountain, Australia
Tamborine Mountain - mountain in Queensland, Australia